Syntaxis is a style in writing or in rhetoric that favors complex syntax, in contrast to the simple sentence structures of parataxis. For example, 19th-century German academic prose, and John Milton's Paradise Lost poetry in English are notably syntactic. Syntaxis, depending on the author, may also contrast with or include hypotaxis.

Rhetoric
Syntax